Bozhak is a village in Kardzhali Municipality, Kardzhali Province, southern Bulgaria.

References

Villages in Kardzhali Province